The cervical spinal nerve 7 (C7) is a spinal nerve of the cervical segment.

It originates from the spinal column from above the cervical vertebra 7 (C7).

It runs through the interspace between the C6 and C7 vertebrae.

Additional Images

References

Spinal nerves